OFL may stand for :
 Off-line
 Ontario Federation of Labour, a Canadian trade union federation.
 SIL Open Font License by SIL International
 Overfishing level
 Overflow (disambiguation)